Global Underground 037: Bangkok is a DJ mix album in the Global Underground series, compiled and mixed by DJ and producer James Lavelle.  The entry is Lavelle's third in the Global Underground series.

Track listing

External links 

Global Underground
2009 compilation albums